Winneth Dube (born 10 May 1972) is a retired Zimbabwean athlete specialising in the sprinting events. She competed in the 100 metres at the 2004 Olympic Games without reaching the second round.

Competition record

Personal bests
Outdoor
100 metres – 11.36 (+1.2 m/s) (Durban 2003) NR
200 metres – 23.23 (0.0 m/s) (Pretoria 2003) NR
400 metres – 54.86 (Calgary 2009)

Indoor
60 metres – 7.52 (Calgary 2008, 2010) NR
200 metres – 24.81 (Winnipeg 2005) NR

External links

1972 births
Living people
Zimbabwean female sprinters
Athletes (track and field) at the 2004 Summer Olympics
Olympic athletes of Zimbabwe
Athletes (track and field) at the 2002 Commonwealth Games
Commonwealth Games competitors for Zimbabwe
World Athletics Championships athletes for Zimbabwe
African Games competitors for Zimbabwe
Athletes (track and field) at the 2003 All-Africa Games
Olympic female sprinters